Kowalskie may refer to the following places in Poland:
Kowalskie, Lower Silesian Voivodeship (south-west Poland)
Kowalskie, Greater Poland Voivodeship (west-central Poland)